Chenopodium curvispicatum is a species of plant in the family Amaranthaceae, endemic to Australia.

It is a shrub reaching 1 metre in height with triangular  leaves covered in hairs. The inflorescences are drooping panicles with flowers that may be male, female or bisexual. These are followed by rounded red berries.

The species occurs in the states of Western Australia, South Australia, Victoria and New South Wales.

References

curvispicatum
Caryophyllales of Australia
Flora of New South Wales
Flora of South Australia
Flora of Victoria (Australia)
Eudicots of Western Australia
Plants described in 1983
Taxa named by Paul G. Wilson